The Vanuatu national rugby league team represents Vanuatu in international rugby league matches. The team was founded in 2011 and is administered by the Vanuatu Rugby League (VRL).

History
The Vanuatu national team was founded in 2011 after Australian Dane Campbell began to promote rugby league in Vanuatu. Campbell was the inaugural head coach of the team. They played their first match in the Cabramatta International Nines on 4 February 2012. Joe Meninga, nephew of Mal Meninga, was selected in Vanuatu's squad for the tournament. The team were undefeated in reaching the final, where they lost to the Australian Aboriginal team.

Vanuatu played their first test match against Greece on 20 October 2012, which they lost 14-24. On 20 August 2013, David Simpson was announced as head coach, succeeding the inaugural head coach Dane Campbell.

Current squad
Squad selected for the 2018 Emerging Nations World Championship;
Avia Allen
Amani Arutahiki
Rob Franklin
Maxwell Garae Ngatonga
Ben Henderson
Patrick Jack
Stanley Joseph
Anro Kalpukai
Daniel Kaltapang
Andrew Kaltongga
Salitasi Lolo
Ben Lui
Danford Lui
Tonny Lui
Alehana Mara
Alickson Napakaurana
Potefa Nishina
Kalsauma Oscar
Alex Philip
Dominique Sablan
Max Taleo
Stephen Tanga
Daniel Wood
James Wood

International results

All-time results record and ranking

Below is a list Vanuatu national team record as of 23 December 2020.

Current players of Ni-Vanuatu descent
 Alehana Mara (debuted for Vanuatu against Greece on 20 October 2012)
 Justin O'Neill
 Zac Santo
 Travis Waddell

See also

References

External links

Rugby league
National rugby league teams